The 2012–13 Southern Miss Golden Eagles men's basketball team represented the University of Southern Mississippi during the 2012–13 NCAA Division I men's basketball season. The Golden Eagles, led by first year head coach Donnie Tyndall, played their home games at Reed Green Coliseum and were members of Conference USA. They finished the season 27–10, 12–4 in C-USA play to finish in second place. They advanced to the championship game of the Conference USA tournament where they lost to Memphis in two overtimes. They received an invitation to the 2013 National Invitation Tournament where they Charleston Southern in the first round and Louisiana Tech in the second round before losing in the quarterfinals to BYU.

In 2016, the NCAA vacated all 27 wins (including 12 conference wins) due to participation of academically ineligible players.

Roster

Schedule

|-
!colspan=9| Exhibition
 
 
|-
!colspan=9| Regular season

|-
!colspan=9| 2013 Conference USA tournament

|-
!colspan=9| 2013 NIT

References

Southern Miss Golden Eagles basketball seasons
Southern Miss
Southern Miss